Moja je pjesma lagana (My song is light) is song by Zagreb band Parni Valjak. It was released in 1988 on album Sjaj u očima (Shine in eyes). It is one of their greatest hits.

Composition 
It is composed and written by Husein Hasanefendiċ.

Music video 
Video was filmed in Zagreb during fall same year.

References 

1988 songs
1988 singles
Jugoton singles
Yugoslav music
Song articles with missing songwriters